Selivanovsky (masculine), Selivanovskaya (feminine), or Selivanovskoye (neuter) is the name of several rural localities in Russia:
Selivanovsky (rural locality), a village in Davletovsky Selsoviet of Abzelilovsky District of the Republic of Bashkortostan
Selivanovskaya, Lensky District, Arkhangelsk Oblast, a village in Ryabovsky Selsoviet of Lensky District of Arkhangelsk Oblast
Selivanovskaya, Verkhnetoyemsky District, Arkhangelsk Oblast, a village in Fedkovsky Selsoviet of Verkhnetoyemsky District of Arkhangelsk Oblast
Selivanovskaya, Vinogradovsky District, Arkhangelsk Oblast, a village in Konetsgorsky Selsoviet of Vinogradovsky District of Arkhangelsk Oblast
Selivanovskaya, Rostov Oblast, a stanitsa in Selivanovskoye Rural Settlement of Milyutinsky District of Rostov Oblast